The Hashemite Kingdom of Hejaz (Al-Mamlakah al-Ḥijāziyyah Al-Hāshimiyyah) was a state in the Hejaz region in the Middle East that included the western portion of the Arabian Peninsula that was ruled by the Hashemite dynasty. It was self-proclaimed as a kingdom in June 1916 during the First World War, to be independent from the Ottoman Empire, on the basis of an alliance with the British Empire to drive the Ottoman Army from the Arabian Peninsula during the Arab Revolt.

The United Kingdom promised King Ali of Hejaz a single independent Arab state that would include modern day Iraq, Israel, Jordan, Palestine, and Syria in addition to the Hejaz region. However, at the end of the First World War, the Treaty of Versailles turned Syria into a French League of Nations mandate and Iraq, Palestine and Transjordan into British mandates. Hashemite princes were installed as monarchs under the British mandates in Transjordan and Iraq; this became known as the Sharifian solution.

Relations with the British Empire further deteriorated when Zionist Jews were allowed to move to Palestine. Hussein refused to ratify the 1919 Treaty of Versailles and in response to a 1921 British proposal to sign a treaty accepting the Mandate system stated that he could not be expected to "affix his name to a document assigning Palestine to the Zionists and Syria to foreigners". A further British attempt to reach a treaty failed in 1923–24 and negotiations were suspended in March 1924; within six months the British withdrew their support in favour of their central Arabian ally Ibn Saud, who proceeded to conquer Hussein's kingdom.

On 23 September 1932, the Kingdom of Hejaz and Nejd was unified with the other Saudi dominions, creating the unified Kingdom of Saudi Arabia.

Background 
In 1908, The Young Turks took over the Ottoman Empire, and in 1909 when a counter-coup failed, The Young Turks "secularized" the government. Hussein bin Ali, Sharif of Mecca, was appointed by the previous Sultan of the Ottoman Empire and did not favor the Young Turks, his opposition to the empire grew over time, culminating to the Arab Revolt.

History
In their capacity as Caliphs, the Sultans of the Ottoman Empire would appoint an official known as the Sharif of Mecca. The role went to a member of the Hashemite family, but the Sultans typically promoted Hashemite intra-familial rivalries in their choice, preventing the building of a solid base of power in the Sharif.

With the outbreak of the First World War in 1914, the Sultan, Mehmed V, in his capacity as Caliph, declared a jihad against the Entente powers. The British in particular hoped to co-opt the Sharif as a weighty alternative religious figure backing them in the conflict. The British already had a series of treaties with other Arab leaders in the region and were also fearful that the Hejaz could be used as a base to attack their shipping to and from India.

The Sharif was cautious but, after discovering that the Ottomans planned to remove and possibly murder him, agreed to work with the British if they would support a wider Arab Revolt and the establishment of an independent Arab Kingdom  the British implied they would. After the Ottomans executed other Arab nationalist leaders in Damascus and Beirut, the Hejaz rose against and soundly defeated them, almost completely expelling them (Medina remaining under Ottoman control throughout).

In June 1916, Hussein bin Ali, Sharif of Mecca, declared himself King of Hejaz as his Sharifian Army participated with other Arab Forces and the British Empire in expelling the Ottomans from the Arabian Peninsula.

The US State Department quotes an aide-mémoire dated 24 October 1917 given by the Arab Bureau to the American Diplomatic Agency in Cairo confirming that

The British, though, were compromised by their agreement to give the French control of Syria (comprising modern-day Syria and Lebanon) and did not, in Hussein's eyes, honour their commitments. Nevertheless, they did eventually create Hashemite-ruled kingdoms (in protectorate form) in Transjordan and in Iraq, as well as Hejaz. The changing boundaries of the Ottoman Hejaz Vilayet contributed to uncertainties between the neighbouring Hashemite kingdoms, particularly the competing claim with Transjordan over the inclusion of the sanjak of Ma'an, including the cities of Ma'an and Aqaba.

King Hussein refused to ratify the 1919 Treaty of Versailles, and in response to a 1921 British proposal to sign a treaty accepting the Mandate system stated that he could not be expected to "affix his name to a document assigning Palestine to the Zionists and Syria to foreigners." A further British attempt to reach a treaty failed in 1923–24, and negotiations were suspended in March 1924; within six months the British withdrew their support in favour of their central Arabian ally Ibn Saud, who proceeded to conquer Hussein's Kingdom.

The League of Nations Covenant provided for membership to the signatories of the Peace Treaties; the Hejaz was one of three (the other two were the United States and Ecuador) that failed to ratify Versailles.

Kings of Hejaz

See also

 History of Saudi Arabia
 T. E. Lawrence
 Sharifate of Mecca
 Sharifian Caliphate

References

Bibliography
 
 
 
 

1916 establishments in Asia
1925 disestablishments in Asia
Former Arab states
Former countries in the Middle East
Former monarchies of Western Asia
House of Hashim
History of Saudi Arabia
 
States and territories established in 1916
States and territories disestablished in 1925